The term WWU has the following meanings:

 University of Münster (Westphalian Wilhelms-University Münster), in Münster, North Rhine-Westphalia, Germany
 Walla Walla University, in Washington, U.S.
 Warehouse Workers United
 Western Washington University, a university located in Bellingham, Washington, U.S.
 William Woods University, in Fulton, Missouri, U.S.
 Working Women United, a women's rights organisation